USS Corona (SP-813) was a yacht acquired by the U.S. Navy during World War I. She was outfitted as a patrol craft, and assigned to the North Atlantic Ocean, based out of Brest, France, to protect shipping from the German submarines and Q-ships. Post-war she was decommissioned, returned to her original condition, and disposed of by public auction.

Built in Scotland 

Corona (No. 813) was built in 1905 by Hawthorne & Co., Leith, Scotland; purchased by the Navy 10 June 1917; commissioned at New York City 20 July 1917, Lieutenant L. M. Stevens in command; and reported to Patrol Force, Atlantic Fleet.

World War I service 
 
Corona departed New York City 31 July 1917 for St. John's, Newfoundland and Labrador, the Azores, and Brest, France, where she arrived 30 August. She escorted convoys and patrolled in the English Channel and off the west coast of France, based on Brest, until the end of World War I.
 
Corona sailed from Brest 5 December 1918 for New London, Connecticut, arriving 28 December .

Post-war decommissioning and sale 

In reserve at New London, Connecticut, until 5 May 1919, she sailed then for New York City, arriving 6 May. Corona was decommissioned 17 May 1919, and sold 1 October 1921.

References

 
 USS Corona (SP-813), 1917-1921 Originally the steam yacht Corona (1905)

Steam yachts
Ships built in Leith
World War I patrol vessels of the United States
1905 ships